Oceanimonas doudoroffii is a Gram-negative marine bacterium. The rod-shaped, motile bacterium is aerobic and chemoorganotroph.

References

External links
J.P. Euzéby: List of Prokaryotic names with Standing in Nomenclature
Type strain of Oceanimonas doudoroffii at BacDive -  the Bacterial Diversity Metadatabase

Alteromonadales
Bacteria described in 1972